Elizabeth Lloyd Behjat (née Williams; born 30 December 1958) is an Australian politician who was a Liberal Party member of the Legislative Council of Western Australia from 2009 to 2017, representing North Metropolitan Region.

Behjat was born in Wolverhampton, England, where her Welsh-born father, John Williams, was working as a teacher. The family arrived in Western Australia in 1966, and her father entered politics a few years later, serving in the Legislative Council from 1971 to 1989. Behjat attended Scarborough Senior High School and Churchlands Senior High School, and after leaving school initially worked as a law clerk. She was later employed as a conveyancer, an administrative officer, a casino manager (at the Burswood Casino), a para-legal, and an electorate officer. Behjat was elected to parliament at the 2008 state election, running in third place on the Liberal ticket in North Metropolitan. Her term began on 22 May 2009. Behjat was re-elected to a second four-year term in 2013, but she was defeated for Liberal preselection at the 2017 election, meaning her term in the Legislative Council concluded in May 2017.

References

1958 births
Living people
Australian people of Welsh descent
English emigrants to Australia
Liberal Party of Australia members of the Parliament of Western Australia
Members of the Western Australian Legislative Council
People educated at Churchlands Senior High School
People from Wolverhampton
21st-century Australian politicians
21st-century Australian women politicians
Women members of the Western Australian Legislative Council